Jason Bradford Priestley (born August 28, 1969) is a Canadian actor and television director. He is best known as the virtuous Brandon Walsh on the television series Beverly Hills, 90210 (1990–1998, 2000), as Richard "Fitz" Fitzpatrick in the show Call Me Fitz (2010–2013) and for his role as Matt Shade in the Canadian series Private Eyes (2016–2021).

Early life
Jason Bradford Priestley was born on August 28, 1969, in North Vancouver, British Columbia. His mother, Sharon Kirk, was an actress and acting coach. He is a graduate of Argyle Secondary School in North Vancouver. He has an older sister, actress Justine Priestley, and two step-siblings, Karin and Kristi. He became a naturalized American citizen in 2007.

Career
Priestley first started his television career doing commercials for companies such as Fletcher's Meats and then guest-starring as Bobby Conrad a.k.a. Roberto Coronado Jr., a mobster's grandson, in the early 1987 episode "A Piece of Cake" from the fourth and final season of the television series Airwolf, and appeared in two episodes of 21 Jump Street in 1987–88, as 'Pencil' on Quantum Leap (E1S8 May 1989), then moved on to the 1989 short-lived sitcom Sister Kate, which starred Stephanie Beacham. He played Todd, one of the foster children under the care of Sister Kate, an English nun.

In 1990, Priestley was chosen as Brandon Walsh on the hit series Beverly Hills, 90210. The show garnered worldwide fame and popularity and made Priestley a teen idol, he was nominated for two Golden Globes for his work on the show. He also directed 15 of the show's episodes. He remained on the show until 1998, when Brandon moved to Washington, D.C. Brandon was the last Walsh to leave the show; however, Priestley would continue to serve as an executive producer until the show ended in 2000.

Priestley joined the cast of Tru Calling as Jack Harper during 2004 and 2005. He was also a regular on the 2006 program Love Monkey. His television work also includes the WB show What I Like About You and a February 2006 appearance on Without a Trace. Priestley has also made several films, his most notable role perhaps being in 1997's Love and Death on Long Island, in which he played a teen idol struggling to be taken seriously as an actor. He directed the 19th episode in the final season of 7th Heaven. He also directed two episodes of The Secret Life of the American Teenager: "Slice of Life" and "Just Say No." They appeared on August 26, 2008, and September 9, 2008, on ABC Family.

On July 15, 2007, he returned to series television as one of the lead males in Lifetime Television's comedy–drama Side Order of Life. Priestley made a guest appearance on NBC's My Name Is Earl in 2008. He played Blake, Earl's better-looking and more successful cousin. That year, Priestley directed five episodes of Secret Life. Priestley directed the episode when Tori Spelling returned to 90210. In 2009 Priestley directed and co-produced all 12 episodes of the Web series The Lake on TheWB.com. In December 2009 along with Dougray Scott, Brian Cox, and Eddie Izzard, Priestley was featured in The Day of the Triffids, written by Patrick Harbinson, whose credits include ER and Law & Order. The drama is based on John Wyndham's best-selling post-apocalyptic novel, The Day of the Triffids.

Priestley directed his former co-star Luke Perry in the Hallmark Channel movie Goodnight for Justice, which aired in January 2011. He guest-starred as one half of a con artist couple alongside Jennifer Finnigan in a sixth-season episode of USA's Psych and also appeared in the music video "Boys" by Britney Spears. Priestley starred as the main character of the HBO Canada TV show Call Me Fitz from 2010 to 2013. It ended after its fourth season in December 2013. In August 2011 Priestley joined the cast of sci-fi television show Haven, in a recurring role during its second season and made two appearances in the final season. He also directed two episodes.

Priestley's feature film directorial debut was the independent road trip comedy Cas & Dylan, starring Richard Dreyfuss and Tatiana Maslany.

In April 2013, Priestley appeared in Canadian Stage's production of Race, a David Mamet play, in Toronto at the Bluma Appel Theater. In 2015, Priestley starred alongside Gael García Bernal in Zoom, a comedy directed by Pedro Morelli that premiered at the Toronto International Film Festival.

In May 2016, Priestley began starring in the Global TV Network comedy–drama series  Private Eyes, in the role of Matt Shade, a former hockey player turned private detective.

In August 2016, Priestley was inducted into Canada's Walk of Fame.

Jason Priestley was nominated for best lead actor in a comedy series for The Movie Network's Nova Scotia-filmed Call Me Fitz.

In 2013, Priestley directed one episode of the CTV television series Satisfaction.

Personal life

In 1999, Priestley crashed his Porsche car into a telephone pole in Hollywood Hills and was arrested for driving while under the influence. His driver's license was suspended for a year, and he was ordered to complete an alcohol-management program.

Priestley and make-up artist Ashlee Peterson married on February 2, 1999 and divorced 11 months later on January 2, 2000. On May 14, 2005, Priestley married Naomi Lowde, also a make-up artist. On July 2, 2007, the couple had a daughter, Ava Veronica. On April 13, 2009, Priestley announced that he and his wife were expecting their second child. On July 9, 2009, the couple had a son, Dashiell Orson.

On July 9, 2007, he revealed on Late Night with Conan O'Brien that he had become an American citizen several weeks earlier.

Priestley's sister, Justine, is also an actor and appeared in a couple of episodes of the 90210 spin-off Melrose Place, in 1996.

In 2013, the restaurant chain Tim Hortons created a new doughnut in Priestley's honor, called The Priestley. It was not rolled out on a nationwide scale, however.

On May 6, 2014, HarperOne published Priestley's autobiography Jason Priestley: A Memoir.

Race-car driving
Priestley's hobbies include race-car driving. He rallied a Toyota Celica All-Trac ST185 in the SCCA Pro Rally Series during the early to mid-1990s. He has provided commentary and interviews of racers for ABC's TV coverage of IndyCar racing. Priestley transitioned toward circuit racing in 1996. Over the following two seasons, he drove Ford Mustangs in IMSA GTS, USRRC GT1, and Motorola Cup competition with Multimatic Motorsports. In 1999, he participated in the first Gumball 3000 rally, driving a Lotus Esprit V-8. On August 11, 2002, he was seriously injured during a practice run at the Kentucky Speedway when his Indy Pro Series car crashed into a wall at nearly 180 miles per hour.

According to a January 2008 Associated Press article, it was announced that Priestley would become a joint owner in a new IndyCar Series team. The new team was known as Rubicon Race Team managed by co-owner Jim Freudenberg. They initially entered a car in the 2008 Indianapolis 500. The car was prepared by Indianapolis-based Sam Schmidt Motorsports and the driver was Max Papis.

In the article, Priestley said, "I'm excited to be able to spend the month of May in Indy with my good friends and be a part of the greatest open wheel race. . . . It's been more than five years since my accident, and it's going to be so good to get to see everyone." Despite the team's enthusiasm, it suffered a crash during the second weekend of qualifying, then had subsequent gearbox problems and failed to qualify for the race.

Priestley was among the owners of the FAZZT Race Team, which competed in the IndyCar Series in 2010 with Canadian racer Alex Tagliani. The car, numbered 77 and sponsored by Bowers & Wilkins, was bought out in 2011 by Sam Schmidt Motorsports. With Tagliani retained by the team, he won the pole at the 2011 Indianapolis 500. In October 2011, two-time and defending Indy 500 winner Dan Wheldon took over at Kentucky. At the season-ending IZOD IndyCar World Championship at Las Vegas Motor Speedway, Wheldon was killed in a 15-car crash.

Promotional activity for Barenaked Ladies
Priestley is a big fan of the band Barenaked Ladies and went to many of their California concerts in the early to mid-1990s. He eventually met the band and in his desire to help them succeed, suggested that he direct the music video for "The Old Apartment," and use his fame to persuade American stations to air it. He did just that, and also invited the band to play at the "Peach Pit After Dark" on an episode of 90210. Lead singer Ed Robertson continues to cite him as being instrumental in their American success. His final notable contribution to the band came when he directed a feature-length documentary about the band's 1999 whirlwind of success titled Barenaked in America, intending to capture on film the fun he had while riding around on the tour bus with the band.

Filmography

Film

Television

Music videos

As a director

Awards and nominations
Gemini Awards
2003: Nominated, "Best Performance or Host in a Variety Program or Series" – The True Meaning of Christmas Specials (shared w/co-stars)

Golden Globe Awards
1993: Nominated, "Best Performance by an Actor in a TV-Series (Drama)" – Beverly Hills, 90210
1995: Nominated, "Best Performance by an Actor in a TV-Series (Drama)" – Beverly Hills, 90210

Young Artist Awards
1990: Nominated, "Best Young Actor Supporting Role in a Television Series" – Sister Kate

See also
List of celebrities who own wineries and vineyards

References

External links

Jason Priestley Interview on The Hour with George Stroumboulopoulos

1969 births
Living people
20th-century Canadian male actors
21st-century American male actors
21st-century Canadian male actors
American film producers
American male film actors
American male television actors
American male voice actors
American television directors
Best Actor in a Comedy Series Canadian Screen Award winners
Canadian Comedy Award winners
Canadian emigrants to the United States
Canadian expatriate male actors in the United States
Film producers from British Columbia
Canadian male film actors
Canadian male television actors
Canadian male voice actors
Canadian racing drivers
Canadian television directors
Film directors from Vancouver
Indy Lights drivers
IndyCar Series team owners
Male actors from Vancouver
Motorsport announcers
Naturalized citizens of the United States
People from North Vancouver
Racing drivers from British Columbia
Sportspeople from Vancouver
Canadian twins
American twins
Twin sportspeople
Multimatic Motorsports drivers